Rudolf Nuske (born 8 October 1942) is an Austrian former footballer and coach.

References

1942 births
Living people
Association football midfielders
Austrian football managers
SK Rapid Wien players
SK Rapid Wien managers
Austrian footballers